Sengileyevsky District  is an administrative and municipal district (raion), one of the twenty-one in Ulyanovsk Oblast, Russia. It is located in the center of the oblast. Its administrative center is the town of Sengiley. Population: 23,260 (2010 Census);  The population of Sengiley accounts for 29.9% of the district's total population.

References

Notes

Sources

Districts of Ulyanovsk Oblast